Angela Caroline Thorp (born 7 December 1972) is a female British 100 metres hurdler and sprinter.

Athletics career
Thorp competed in the 100 metres hurdles and women's 4 × 100 metres relay at the 1996 Summer Olympics.

She broke the British 100 metres hurdles record of 1992 Olympic Champion Sally Gunnell at the games, running a personal best time of 12.80 seconds in the semi-final finishing 5th. She therefore did not make one of the top four qualifiers for the final. However, the 3rd placed athlete in this semi-final, Nataliya Shekhodanova of Russia, was subsequently disqualified after the final for doping offences which meant that also after the final Thorp was retrospectively upgraded to 4th place in the semi-final. At the games she was also a part of the British team which finished 8th in the 4 x 100 metres relay final.

Thorp won a British title in 1996  and represented England in the 100 metres hurdles event, at the 1998 Commonwealth Games in Kuala Lumpur, Malaysia.

Thorp's British record stood for 15 years until it was broken in 2011 by Tiffany Porter. Thorp said that she was "devastated" at losing her record to an American-born athlete. She said that she would have congratulated an established British athlete who took her record; at the time Jessica Ennis and Sarah Claxton both had personal bests of 12.81s. Ennis later took the British record at the London 2012 Olympic Games.

References

External links
 

1972 births
Living people
Athletes (track and field) at the 1996 Summer Olympics
British female sprinters
British female hurdlers
Olympic athletes of Great Britain
Athletes (track and field) at the 1998 Commonwealth Games
Commonwealth Games competitors for England
People from Wombwell